Hogben is a surname. Notable people with the surname include:

 Hogben (Kent cricketer) (fl. 1780s), English cricketer known only by his surname
 Alia Hogben, Canadian social worker and Muslim women activist
 Edward Hewlett Hogben (1875 – 1936), Australian architect
 Frances Hogben (born 1937), British Olympic swimmer
 George Hogben (1853 – 1920), New Zealand educationalist and seismologist
 Horace Hogben (1888 – 1975), Australian politician
 Lancelot Hogben (1895–1975), British zoologist, medical statistician  and popular science writer
 Lawrence Hogben (1916–2015), British/New Zealand Royal Navy officer, scientist and mathematician 
 Leslie Hogben, American mathematician
 Michael Hogben (born 1952), British auctioneer, antiques dealer, author and TV personality
 Peter Hogben (1925 – 2011) Archdeacon of Dorking

Fictional characters
 Hogben family from Hogben series, science fiction comedy short stories & novel
 Engineer Hogben from The First Men in the Moon (1919 film)

See also 

Hogben toad (disambiguation)